Pudeoniscidae is a family of malacostracans in the order Isopoda.

Genera
Brasiloniscus Lemos de Castro, 1973
Iansaoniscus Campos-Filho, Bichuette, Montesanto, Araujo & Taiti, 2017
Oxossioniscus Campos-Filho, Lisboa & Cardoso, 2018
Pudeoniscus Vandel, 1963

References

Woodlice
Crustacean families